Cora Unashamed is a 2000 American made-for-television drama film from The American Collection directed by Deborah Pratt, starring Regina Taylor and Cherry Jones. The film was shot on location in October 1999 in central Iowa. Cities such as Ames, Cambridge and Story City were used. The movie is based on a short story by the same name in The Ways of White Folks, a 1934 collection of short stories by Langston Hughes.  Cinematographer Ernest Holzman won an American Society of Cinematographers (ASC) Award, for Outstanding Achievement in Cinematography in Movies of the Week/Mini-Series'/Pilot for Network or Basic Broadcast TV, for his work on this film.  David Herbert Donald called the short story "a brilliantly realized portrait of an isolated black woman in a small Middle Western town, who stoically survives her own sorrows but in the end lashes out against the hypocrisy of the whites who employ her."

Synopsis
This adaptation of Langston Hughes' powerful tale, set in the 1920s and 30s, tells the story of Cora Jenkins, the daughter of the only African-American family in the small Iowa town of Melton. Cora supports her mother and her daughter, Josephine, by working as a domestic in the home of the socially driven Mrs. Studevant, where she serves almost as a surrogate mother to the Studevants' daughter, Jessie. Cora's own daughter dies, and Cora's relationship with Jessie grows even deeper. When Jessie dies as a result of an abortion arranged by her mother and the latter lies about the cause to preserve her social standing, Cora must risk her livelihood, her security, and her place in the community in order to speak the truth and honor the memory of the child she loved and lost.

Cast
 Regina Taylor - Cora Jenkins
 Cherry Jones - Lizbeth Studevant
 Ellen Muth - Jessie Studevant
 Molly Graham - 5 year-old Jessie
 Michael Gaston - Arthur Studevant
 Kohl Sudduth - Joe
 Arlen Dean Snyder - Dr. Siebels
 CCH Pounder - Ma Jenkins
 Tinashe - Josephine Jenkins
 Ben Easter - Willie Matsoulis
 Melissa Albright - Mary Studevant
 Tiffany M. Wren - 13 year-old Mary
 Tom Woodward - Reverend Macelroy
 Bethany Larson - Muriel Debord
 David Fritts - Tom Debord
 Stephen George - Luther Jenkins
 John Easter - Mr. Matsoulis
 Logan Rees - Paperboy

Home media
The film was released on VHS on December 4, 2001.

References

External links 
 
 Cora Unashamed at Rotten Tomatoes
 
 
 

2000 television films
2000 films
2000 drama films
American drama films
Films about race and ethnicity
Films based on short fiction
Television shows based on short fiction
Works by Langston Hughes
2000s English-language films
2000s American films